Peas Eddy Island is an island in Delaware County, New York. It is located east-southeast of Hancock, on the East Branch Delaware River.

References

River islands of New York (state)
Landforms of Delaware County, New York
Islands of the Delaware River